Copadichromis chrysonotus is a species of fish in the family Cichlidae. It is found in Malawi, Mozambique, and Tanzania. Its natural habitat is freshwater lakes.

References

chrysonotus
Taxa named by George Albert Boulenger
Fish described in 1908
Taxonomy articles created by Polbot